Pleistodontes macrocainus is a species of fig wasp which is native to Australia.  It is associated with Ficus cerasicarpa and F. brachypoda.

Description 

Taxonomy 
Pleistodontes macrocainus was described by Carlos Lopez-Vaamonde, Dale Dixon, James M. Cook and Jean-Yves Rasplus in 2002 based on specimens collected from Ficus cerasicarpa. Since they could not discern any consistent differences between the wasps collected from F. cerasicarpa and F. brachypoda, they concluded that both figs are pollinated by the same species of fig wasp.

References 

Agaonidae
Hymenoptera of Australia
Insects described in 2002